The finspot wrasse (Xenojulis margaritaceus), also known as the pinkspeckled wrasse, pearly rainbowfish or pearly weed wrasse, is a species of wrasse native to the western Pacific Ocean. It can also be found in the aquarium trade. This species is the only known member of its genus.

References

Labridae
Fish described in 1883